Hendricks Township is one of fourteen townships in Shelby County, Indiana, United States. As of the 2010 census, its population was 1,286 and it contained 517 housing units.

The township bears the name of Governor William Hendricks.

Geography

Unincorporated towns
 Bengal
 Smithland
 Marietta

References

External links
 Indiana Township Association
 United Township Association of Indiana

Townships in Shelby County, Indiana
Townships in Indiana